George Albert "Gay" McIntyre (28 April 1933 – 27 October 2021) was an Irish jazz musician, based in Derry.

Early life
McIntyre was born on 28 April 1933 in Ballybofey, Donegal, and as a teenager began performing with jazz bands in Donegal and Derry. His father, Willie, and his mother encouraged his interest in music and his father bought him a clarinet.

References

External links
 

Jazz musicians from Northern Ireland
1933 births
2021 deaths
People from Ballybofey
Musicians from County Donegal